Mansour Gueye (born December 30, 1985 in Dakar) is a Senegalese-Romanian footballer who plays as a striker for Romanian Liga III side CSM Satu Mare. He was nicknamed in Romania "Omul-Foarfecă", which means "Scissor Man", for his spectacular scissors kick goals.

Club career

Servette
Being a young striker he played just one year for the second team, time in which he scored seven goals in ten appearances.

Politehnica Timișoara
He was a pacey striker, with good heading skills. After a short spell at the Servette, the young Senegalese arrived in Timișoara before the start of the Divizia A 2004–2005 season. He was one of the most spectacular players of Politehnica Timişoara and one of the club's most promising young players in 2006. In the summer of 2009, he returned to Politehnica Timişoara, but he was injured for 6 months. On 22 September he scored 1 goal in 3–1 victory in Romanian Cup against Juventus București. Later, he got injured again.

CS Buftea
After a mistake in his transfer clause to Dinamo București in 2007 he was kicked out from both teams and he did not train properly for months. Politehnica Timişoara agreed to let him back into the squad in 2008, and he was loaned out to the second league club CS Buftea where he scored 9 goals in 13 games. Politehnica Timişoara's coach Dušan Uhrin, Jr. wanted him back at the team, but this did not happen, as Dušan Uhrin was sacked before the winter break.

Gloria Buzău
Mansour returned to the Romanian first league after being loaned for the 2009 spring season to Gloria Buzău.

Personal life
Mansour has three brothers and four sisters, two of his brothers were also footballers: Azis played at junior level in Italy for Fiorentina, Juventus and A.S. Roma and Ousmane played mostly for clubs in the Romanian lower leagues. In 2008 he got married with Adelina Ziele but got divorced after a few months. Around 2010 he met Ramona Popa who gave birth about one year later to his first child, Mouhamed.

Honours
Ordabasy
Kazakhstan Super Cup: 2012

References

External links
 
 
 
  

1985 births
Living people
Senegalese footballers
Senegalese expatriate footballers
Servette FC players
FC Politehnica Timișoara players
LPS HD Clinceni players
FC Gloria Buzău players
FC Ordabasy players
Hajer FC players
PFC Lokomotiv Plovdiv players
ACS Viitorul Târgu Jiu players
FC Ripensia Timișoara players
Liga I players
Liga II players
Liga III players
Kazakhstan Premier League players
First Professional Football League (Bulgaria) players
Senegalese expatriate sportspeople in Romania
Expatriate footballers in Switzerland
Expatriate footballers in Romania
Expatriate footballers in Kazakhstan
Expatriate footballers in Saudi Arabia
Expatriate footballers in Bulgaria
Senegalese expatriate sportspeople in Saudi Arabia
Footballers from Dakar
Saudi Professional League players
Association football forwards
Romanian people of Senegalese descent